Chak No. 21 MB is a village of Khushab District in the Punjab Province of Pakistan. It is situated on Mitha Tiwana, Adhi Kot road. It is 37 km (23 miles) from District Headquarters Jauharabad and 91 km (57 miles) from Divisional Headquarters Sargodha. The 2001 population was 1,000.

The Union Council is Chak. No:22/MB. The major tribes include: Khokhar, Awan, Rajpoot, Kohlar, Kalera, Balouch, Warraich, and Araeein.

Geography 
The land is in a desert climate, with irrigated areas.

Economy 
The major crops include: gram, wheat, sugar cane.

References
 Local Government Elections - Government of Pakistan

Union councils of Khushab District
Populated places in Khushab District